Viola angustifolia is a species of flowering plant, in the genus Viola.

Taxonomy
It was first described in 1857 by the Chilean paleontologist and zoologist Rudolph Amandus Philippi.

In 2019 the husband-and-wife team of rock gardening enthusiasts John Michael Watson and  renamed the taxon V. wikipedia, after the online encyclopedia Wikipedia. They did so believing that the name V. angustifolia was illegitimate, because it was a later homonym. The name "Viola angustifolia" had been published before Philippi described this species, in 1824 by the Swiss historian and botanist Frédéric Charles Jean Gingins de la Sarraz, writing in the famous Prodromus of Alphonse Pyramus de Candolle, as a nomina nuda, a synonym of a taxon (Pigea banksiana) that is now known as Hybanthus enneaspermus. The name had been proposed on a specimen sheet collected in India, but had never been validly published. As such, the name is what is known as a pro synonymo, a name which cannot be considered as validly published because it is merely a synonymy citation. Watson and Flores were thus wrong to rename the species and V. wikipedia is thus a superfluous and illegitimate name.

Description
It is closely related to V. acanthophylla, V. bustillosia, and V. cheeseana, the latter being newly described by Watson and Flores. It is differentiated from these other species by having a "leaf margin shallowly long-serrate. Peduncle clearly shorter than leaves".

Distribution
The species is presumed to be endemic to the Santiago region of Chile. It is known only from a specimen collected in 1855.

References

angustifolia
Flora of central Chile
Plants described in 2019